Alison Wright (born 1976) is English actress.

Alison Wright may also refer to:

 Alison Wright (photojournalist) (born 1961), American photojournalist and writer
 Alison Wright (cyclist) (born 1980), Australian cyclist
 Alison Wright (athlete) (born 1949), New Zealand middle-distance runner